William Day may refer to:
William H. Day (1825–1900), U.S. Black abolitionist
William Day (bishop) (1529–1596), English clergyman
William Day (divine) (died 1684), English clergyman
William Day (sea captain) (1715–1797), Massachusetts naval captain during the American Revolutionary War
William Day (architect), Irish architect from County Wexford
William Day (horseman) (1823–1908), British racehorse trainer
William Day (lithographer) (1797–1845), British lithographer and watercolour artist
William Day (Australian politician) (fl. 1861), member of the New South Wales Legislative Council
William J. Day (1876–1950), judge from Massachusetts
William Louis Day (1876–1936), American judge
William Peyton Day (1886–1966), architect and co-founder of architectural firm Weeks and Day with Charles Peter Weeks
William R. Day (1849–1923), American diplomat and Supreme Court Justice
William S. Day (1923–1984), American politician in the state of Washington
Will Day, former chair of the UK Sustainable Development Commission
Will Day (born 2001), Australian rules footballer
Bill Day (cartoonist), American cartoonist
Bill Day (baseball) (1867–1923), Major League Baseball player
Bill Day (politician), Virginia
Bill Day (alpine skier) (born 1934), skied for Australia at the 1952 Winter Olympics
Bill Day (filmmaker), American documentary filmmaker